Stringtown is an unincorporated community in Anderson County, Kentucky, US, with a population of 200 people, and an elevation of 840 feet.

References

Unincorporated communities in Kentucky